CA-38 may refer to:

 California's 38th congressional district, an electoral division in the State of California
 USS San Francisco (CA-38), a United States Navy New Orleans-class heavy cruiser
 California State Route 38, a highway in the State of California
 Calcium-38 (Ca-38 or 38Ca), an isotope of calcium
 Caproni Ca.38, an Italian aircraft